Robert Mitchell (born 14 September 1980) is a Welsh athlete competing in high jump.

He finished seventh at the 2006 Commonwealth Games in Melbourne with a jump of 2.15 metres.

Personal bests
His personal best outdoor jump is 2.25 metres, achieved in July 2001 in Bedford.
His personal best indoor jump is 2.24 metres, achieved in January 2009 in Cardiff.

References

External links

 Profile at The Power of Ten

1980 births
Living people
Sportspeople from Hemel Hempstead
British male high jumpers
Welsh high jumpers
Welsh male athletes
Commonwealth Games competitors for Wales
Athletes (track and field) at the 2006 Commonwealth Games